Jean Holmes-Mitchell (born 7 November 1940) is a Panamanian sprinter. She competed in the women's 100 metres at the 1960 Summer Olympics.  She finished second in the 1959 Pan American Games 4 × 100 metres Relay (with Carlota Gooden, Marcela Daniel, and Silvia Hunte). At the 1963 Pan American Games Holmes finished fourth in the 100 metres event.

References

1940 births
Living people
Athletes (track and field) at the 1960 Summer Olympics
Athletes (track and field) at the 1964 Summer Olympics
Panamanian female sprinters
Olympic athletes of Panama
Athletes (track and field) at the 1959 Pan American Games
Athletes (track and field) at the 1963 Pan American Games
Pan American Games silver medalists for Panama
Pan American Games medalists in athletics (track and field)
Competitors at the 1959 Central American and Caribbean Games
Central American and Caribbean Games gold medalists for Panama
Sportspeople from Panama City
Central American and Caribbean Games medalists in athletics
Medalists at the 1959 Pan American Games
Olympic female sprinters